Nil may refer to:

 Nil means champion and cloud. Very symbolic name from Égypte.

Acronyms
 NIL (programming language), an implementation of the Lisp programming language
 Name, image and likeness, a set of rules for American college athletes to receive compensation
 Nanoimprint lithography, a method of fabricating nanometer scale patterns
 Nomina im Indogermanischen Lexikon ("Nominals in the Indo-European Lexicon"), an etymological dictionary
 North Island line, a proposed extension railway of Hong Kong

Music 
 Nil (band), a Japanese rock band
 The Nils, a Canadian punk rock band
 N.I.L or Non-Intentional Lifeform, an Australian hard rock band (1995–98)

Albums
 Nil (album), a 2006 album released by The Gazette
 Nil Recurring, a 2007 EP released by Porcupine Tree

Songs
 "Three Nil", a song by Iowa metal band SlipKnot
 "Nil", a song by Canadian punk band Gob
 "Nil-Nil-Draw", a Song by Gym Class Heroes
 "Nil by Mouth", a song by English metal band Haken

People
 Nil (given name), list of people with the given name
 Nil (surname), list of people with the surname

Other
 Nil (cigarette), a brand of cigarette
 Nil: A Land Beyond Belief, a 2005 graphic novel
 Nil in the Indian numbering system
 Nil, Iran
 Nil ideal, a mathematical concept in ring theory
Null pointer (sometimes written NULL, nil, or None), used in computer programming for an uninitialized, undefined, empty, or meaningless value
 Nil River (Guatemala)
 Jednostka Wojskowa Nil or NIL, a Polish commando unit, part of The Polish Special Forces (Wojska Specjalne)

See also 
 Names for the number 0 in English
 Neel (disambiguation)
 Null (disambiguation)